Mark Wilson (born November 11, 1980) is a former American football offensive tackle. He played college football at the University of California, Berkeley. He played high school football at Fall River High School in Fall River Mills, California.

College career
He played college football at the California.

Professional career

Washington Redskins
He was drafted in the 5th round by the Washington Redskins in the 2004 NFL Draft.

Oakland Raiders
In 2006, he signed with the Oakland Raiders. On September 5, 2009, he was released.

Las Vegas Locomotives
In 2011, he signed with the Las Vegas Locomotives of the United Football League.

References

1980 births
Living people
Players of American football from San Jose, California
American football offensive tackles
California Golden Bears football players
Washington Redskins players
Oakland Raiders players
Las Vegas Locomotives players
Ed Block Courage Award recipients